Swim Girl, Swim is a lost 1927 American silent romantic comedy film produced and distributed by Famous Players-Lasky and Paramount Pictures, now amalgamated as Paramount Famous Lasky. It was directed by Clarence Badger and starred Bebe Daniels. English Channel swimmer Gertrude Ederle has a guest appearance.

Cast
Bebe Daniels as Alice Smith
James Hall as Jerry Marvin
Gertrude Ederle as herself
Josephine Dunn as Helen Tracey
William Austin as Mr. Spangle, PhD.
James T. Mack as Professor Twinkle (credited as James Mack)

References

External links

Lobby advertisements: lobby poster and window card
Still at gettyimages.com
Still at Gertrude Ederle, Queen of the Waves webpage

American silent feature films
Lost American films
Films directed by Clarence G. Badger
Paramount Pictures films
Films based on short fiction
1927 romantic comedy films
American romantic comedy films
Films produced by B. P. Schulberg
American black-and-white films
1927 lost films
Lost romantic comedy films
Silent romantic comedy films
1920s American films
Silent American comedy films
1920s English-language films